Márcio Alexandre Santos Machado (born 18 May 1998) is a Portuguese professional footballer who plays for São João Ver as a forward.

Club career
On 18 March 2018, Márcio made his professional debut with Penafiel in a 2017–18 LigaPro match against Santa Clara.

References

External links

1998 births
Living people
People from Paredes, Portugal
Portuguese footballers
Association football forwards
Liga Portugal 2 players
F.C. Penafiel players
C.D. Cinfães players
A.D. Sanjoanense players
SC São João de Ver players
Sportspeople from Porto District